Hannah Bromley (born 15 November 1986) in New Plymouth, New Zealand is a football central defender who plays in South Korea's WK League for Suwon. She has represented New Zealand on the senior national team as well as various youth national teams.

Club career

IF Floya
Bromley, signed an 18-month contract with IF Fløya in Norway's Toppserien League with an option of a further year, on Monday 1 February 2010.

Herforder SV
Bromley, signed a 2-year contract with Herforder SV in Germanys Women's Bundesliga, on 15 January 2011.

Newcastle Jets
In October 2015, Bromley joined Newcastle Jets.

Suwon
After a season with Newcastle Jets, Bromley joined Suwon together with her teammate Gema Simon.

International career
Bromley regularly attended New Zealand football academies as a youth and represented New Zealand at under-17 level before making her full senior international debut at 17 as a substitute against Japan on 21 May 2004.

She appeared in 2 group games for New Zealand at the 2006 Women's U-20 World Cup.

Bromley was included in the New Zealand Squad for the 2007 Women's World Cup in China where they lost to Brazil 5–0, Denmark 2–0 and China 2–0.

References

External links

 Player bio at New England Mutiny Website

1986 births
Living people
New Zealand women's international footballers
New Zealand women's association footballers
Sportspeople from New Plymouth
Sydney FC (A-League Women) players
Newcastle Jets FC (A-League Women) players
Suwon FC Women players
A-League Women players
Tennessee Technological University alumni
Tennessee Tech Golden Eagles women's soccer players
Central Connecticut State University alumni
Central Connecticut Blue Devils women's soccer players
2007 FIFA Women's World Cup players
Women's association football defenders